Sherdahl is a ghost town in Republic County, Kansas, United States.  It is located 4 miles north of Scandia.

History
A post office was opened in Sherahl in 1887, and remained in operation until it was discontinued in 1905.

Education
The community is served by Pike Valley USD 426 public school district.

References

Further reading

External links
 Republic County maps: Current, Historic, KDOT

Unincorporated communities in Republic County, Kansas
Unincorporated communities in Kansas